Bachelor Lake may refer to:

 Bachelor Lake (Lac Bachelor), in Quebec, Canada, a lake in the same drainage basin as Lake Waswanipi in Nord-du-Québec
 Bachelor Lake, a small lake near Live Oak, Florida, U.S.
 Bachelor Lake, in Aitkin County, Minnesota near Farm Island Township, U.S.
 Bachelor Lake (Brown County, Minnesota), U.S.

See also
 Bachelor's Lake in the Hiawatha National Forest in Michigan, U.S.

References